Reduction, reduced, or reduce may refer to:

Science and technology

Chemistry 
 Reduction (chemistry), part of a reduction-oxidation (redox) reaction in which atoms have their oxidation state changed.
 Organic redox reaction, a redox reaction that takes place with organic compounds
 Ore reduction: see smelting

Computing and algorithms 

 Reduction (complexity), a transformation of one problem into another problem
 Reduction (recursion theory), given sets A and B of natural numbers, is it possible to effectively convert a method for deciding membership in B into a method for deciding membership in A?
 Bit Rate Reduction, an audio compression method
 Data reduction, simplifying data in order to facilitate analysis
 Graph reduction, an efficient version of non-strict evaluation
 L-reduction, a transformation of optimization problems which keeps the approximability features
 Partial order reduction, a technique for reducing the size of the state-space to be searched by a model checking algorithm
 Strength reduction, a compiler optimization where a function of some systematically changing variable is calculated more efficiently by using previous values of the function
 Variance reduction, a procedure used to increase the precision of the estimates that can be obtained for a given number of iterations
 Reduce (computer algebra system), a general-purpose computer algebra system geared towards applications in physics
 Reduce (higher-order function), in functional programming, a family of higher-order functions that process a data structure in some order and build up a return value
 Reduced instruction set computing, a CPU design philosophy favoring an instruction set reduced in size and complexity of addressing, to simplify implementation, instruction level parallelism, and compiling

Pure mathematics and statistics 

 Reducible as the opposite of irreducible (mathematics)
 Reduction (mathematics), the rewriting of an expression into a simpler form
 Beta reduction, the rewriting of an expression from lambda calculus into a simpler form
 Dimension reduction, the process of reducing the number of random variables under consideration
 Lattice reduction, given an integer lattice basis as input, to find a basis with short, nearly orthogonal vectors
 Subject reduction or preservation, a rewrite of an expression that does not change its type
 Reduction of order, a technique for solving second-order ordinary differential equations
 Reduction of the structure group, for a -bundle  and a map  an -bundle  such that the pushout  is isomorphic to 
 Reduction system, reduction strategy, the application of rewriting systems to eliminate reducible expressions
 Reduced form, in statistics, an equation which relates the endogenous variable X to all the available exogenous variables, both those included in the regression of interest (W) and the instruments (Z)
 Reduced homology, a minor modification made to homology theory in algebraic topology, designed to make a point have all its homology groups zero
 Reduced product, a construction that generalizes both direct product and ultraproduct
 Reduced residue system, a set of φ(n) integers such that each integer is relatively prime to n and no two are congruent modulo n
 Reduced ring, a ring with no non-zero nilpotent elements
 Reduced row echelon form, a certain reduced row echelon form of a matrix which completely and uniquely determines its row space
 Reduced word, in a free group, a word with no adjacent generator-inverse pairs

Medicine

Medical procedures 
 Lung volume reduction surgery, a treatment for chronic obstructive pulmonary disease
 Selective reduction (or fetal reduction), the practice of reducing the number of fetuses in a multifetal pregnancy
 Reduction (orthopedic surgery), a medical procedure to restore a fracture or dislocation to the correct alignment
 Ventricular reduction, a type of operation in cardiac surgery
 Cosmetic surgery:
 Breast reduction
 Jaw reduction

Other uses in medicine 
 Weight loss
 In epidemiology:
 Relative risk reduction, the absolute risk reduction by the control event rate
 Absolute risk reduction, the decrease in risk of a given activity or treatment in relation to a control activity or treatment
 Urea reduction ratio (URR),  a dimensionless number used to quantify hemodialysis treatment adequacy

Physics 
 Dimensional reduction, the limit of a compactified theory where the size of the compact dimension goes to zero
 Reduction criterion, in quantum information theory, a necessary condition a mixed state must satisfy in order for it to be separable
 Reduced mass, the "effective" inertial mass appearing in the two-body problem of Newtonian mechanics
 Reduced properties (pressure, temperature, or volume) of a fluid, defined based on the fluid's critical point

Other uses in science and technology 
 Lithic reduction, in Stone Age toolmaking, to detach lithic flakes from a lump of tool stone
 Noise reduction, in acoustic or signal processing
 Reduction drive, a mechanical device to shift rotational speed

Arts and media
 Reducing (film), a 1931 American film
 Reduction (music), music arranged for smaller resources (piano) for easier analysis or performance

Linguistics 
 Accent reduction, modifying one's foreign accent towards that of a native speaker
 Vowel reduction, any change in vowel quality perceived as "weakening"
 Vowel reduction in English
 Relaxed pronunciation, slurring of syllables of common words
 Definite article reduction, use of vowel-less forms of the English definite article in Northern England

Philosophy 
 Reductionism, a range of philosophical systems
 Reductio ad absurdum, a form of argument in which a proposition is disproven by following its implications to an absurd consequence
 Eidetic reduction, a technique in the study of essences in phenomenology whose goal is to identify the basic components of phenomena
 Intertheoretic reduction, in philosophy of science, one theory makes predictions that perfectly or almost perfectly match the predictions of a second theory

Settlements 
 Reductions, settlements in Spanish America intended to control and Christianize Indians
 Indian reductions in the Andes, settlements in the Andes to control and Christianize Indians

Other uses 
 Reduction (cooking), the process of thickening or intensifying the flavor of a liquid mixture such as a soup, sauce, wine, or juice by evaporation
 Reduction (military), the siege and capture of a fortified place
 Reduction (Sweden), a return to the Crown of fiefs that had been granted to the Swedish nobility
 Reduce (waste), practices of minimizing waste
 Reduction, Pennsylvania, unincorporated community, United States
 Reduction in rank, in military law
 Reduction to practice, in United States patent law, the embodiment of the concept of an invention
 Ego reduction, predicated on the use of Sigmund Freud's concept of the ego
 Reductions, resettlement of indigenous peoples during the Spanish colonization of the Americas

See also 
 Prevention (disambiguation)
 Risk reduction (disambiguation)

Mathematics disambiguation pages